RAP1 GTPase activating protein 2 is a protein in humans that is encoded by the RAP1GAP2 gene.

This gene encodes a GTPase-activating protein that activates the small guanine-nucleotide-binding protein Rap1 in platelets. The protein interacts with synaptotagmin-like protein 1 and Rab27 and regulates secretion of dense granules from platelets at sites of endothelial damage. Multiple transcript variants encoding different isoforms have been found for this gene. [provided by RefSeq, Sep 2009].

References

Further reading